Special addresses by the monarch of United Kingdom and the other Commonwealth realms (and previously of the British Empire and its Dominions), outside the annual Royal Christmas Message and the Commonwealth Day Message, only take place at times of significant national or royal events.

British monarchs have given speeches for centuries but it was only in the 20th century, with the advent of radio, that the Monarch was able to address the whole nation at once. On Christmas Day in 1932, King George V became the first British monarch to make a live radio broadcast to the nation. The tradition of the monarch broadcasting to the nation on Christmas Day continues to this day. Special addresses by the Monarch on days other than Christmas Day, however, are extremely rare and have only occurred at times of significant national or royal events.

List of special addresses

This list does not include Empire Day and Commonwealth Day broadcasts.

George V

Edward VIII

George VI

Elizabeth II

Charles III

References

External links
Some of King George VI's broadcasts
The Royal Family and technology

British monarchy
British television specials
Speeches by heads of state